Polistes rothneyi is a species of paper wasp from China, Korea, and Japan.

References

External links
 
 

rothneyi
Insects described in 1900